Katherine Boyer Waterston (born March 3, 1980) is a British-American actress. She made her feature film debut in Michael Clayton (2007). She had supporting roles in films including Robot & Frank, Being Flynn (both 2012) and The Disappearance of Eleanor Rigby (2013), before her breakthrough performance in Inherent Vice (2014). She portrayed Chrisann Brennan in Steve Jobs (2015), and went on to star in Fantastic Beasts and Where to Find Them (2016) and its sequels. Her other film roles were in Alien: Covenant (2017), Logan Lucky (2017), The Current War (2017), Mid90s (2018) and The World to Come (2020).

Early life 
Katherine Boyer Waterston was born March 3, 1980, in Westminster, London, the daughter of American parents, Lynn Louisa (née Woodruff), a former model, and actor Sam Waterston. She holds dual citizenship. Her father is of English and Scottish descent. Her sister is actress Elisabeth Waterston and her brother is director Graham Waterston. She has an older half-brother, James Waterston, also an actor.

She was raised in Connecticut, and graduated from the Loomis Chaffee School in 1998.

Career
In 2007, Waterston made her big screen debut starring in the independent drama film The Babysitters appearing alongside John Leguizamo and Cynthia Nixon. Also in 2007, Waterston performed in the play Los Angeles by Julian Sheppard and in 2008, she performed in the play Kindness by Adam Rapp. In 2010, Waterston played the role of Gena in the original Off-Broadway production of Leslye Headland’s Bachelorette, played in the 2011 film version by Lizzy Caplan. In 2011, she played Anya in the Classic Stage Company revival of The Cherry Orchard. Also in 2011, she performed in Dreams of Flying, Dreams of Falling, also by Adam Rapp, at the Classic Stage Company.

After playing supporting roles in films including Enter Nowhere (2011), Being Flynn (2012), The Letter (2012), and The Disappearance of Eleanor Rigby (2013), Waterston was cast in the crime film Inherent Vice written and directed by Paul Thomas Anderson. The film and her performance received generally positive reviews from critics. The following year, she appeared in Queen of Earth and Steve Jobs playing Chrisann Brennan.

In 2016, Waterston was cast as Tina Goldstein in the fantasy film Fantastic Beasts and Where to Find Them opposite Eddie Redmayne. The film received generally positive reviews from critics and emerged a commercial success after grossing $814 million worldwide. Waterston reprised her role in Fantastic Beasts: The Crimes of Grindelwald in 2018, and had a short part in Fantastic Beasts: The Secrets of Dumbledore (2022). In 2017, she starred alongside Michael Fassbender in the science fiction horror film Alien: Covenant directed by Ridley Scott. Also that year she starred in the Steven Soderbergh's comedy-drama Logan Lucky and Alfonso Gomez-Rejon's historical drama The Current War. The following years she starred in the independent films State Like Sleep (2018), Mid90s (2018), Amundsen (2019) and The World to Come (2020). In 2020, she starred in the British-American horror drama series The Third Day alongside Jude Law. In 2022, she joined the cast of the second season of HBO period drama series Perry Mason.

Personal life

Waterston was previously in a six-year relationship with American playwright and director Adam Rapp. His 2011 three-play collection The Hallway Trilogy is dedicated to her; she appeared as Rose Hathaway in Part 1: Rose in its premiere at the Rattlestick Playwrights Theater.

In November 2018, Waterston confirmed that she was expecting her first child. Her son was born in 2019.

Filmography

Film

Television

Shorts

Video games

Stage

Awards and nominations

References

External links 

 
 

Living people
21st-century American actresses
Actresses from London
Actresses from New York City
American film actresses
American stage actresses
American television actresses
American people of English descent
American people of Scottish descent
Tisch School of the Arts alumni
1980 births